The 1936 Fordham Rams football team represented Fordham University during the 1936 college football season. 
Led by fourth-year head coach Jim Crowley, the Rams' offense scored 128 over eight games, while the defense allowed no more than seven points in any game, and shut out three teams, including second-ranked 

This team is best remembered for its offensive line, the Seven Blocks of Granite, which included future National Football League (NFL) head coach Vince Lombardi. The line coach was Frank Leahy.

(The previous year, Fordham had spoiled NYU's undefeated season and bowl hopes with a  

Fordham ended up 15th in the final AP rankings in the first year for the poll.

Schedule

Rankings

References

Fordham
Fordham Rams football seasons
Fordham Rams football